Delahoussaye is a surname. Notable people with the surname include:

Eddie Delahoussaye (born 1951), American jockey
Hadley Delahoussaye, fictional character
Ryan Delahoussaye, member of American alternative rock band Blue October